Chimarra antilliana is a species of fingernet caddisfly in the family Philopotamidae. It is found in Dominica.

References 

Trichoptera
Insects described in 1968